The first season of the American television series Person of Interest premiered on September 22, 2011, and ended on May 17, 2012. The season is produced by Kilter Films, Bad Robot Productions, and Warner Bros. Television, with Jonathan Nolan, Greg Plageman, J. J. Abrams, and Bryan Burk serving as executive producers and Plageman serving as showrunner. 

The series was ordered to series in May 2011 and stars Jim Caviezel, Taraji P. Henson, Kevin Chapman and Michael Emerson. The series revolves around a mysterious reclusive billionaire computer programmer, Harold Finch, who has developed a computer program for the federal government known as "the Machine" that is capable of collating all sources of information to predict terrorist acts and to identify people planning them. The Machine also identifies perpetrators and victims of other premeditated deadly crimes; however, because the government considers these "irrelevant", Finch programs the Machine to delete this information each night and programs the Machine to notify him secretly of the "irrelevant" numbers. Finch recruits John Reese, a former Green Beret and CIA agent, now presumed dead – to investigate the people identified by the numbers the Machine has provided, and to act accordingly. 

The season premiered with a 13-episode order before being given a 9-episode back-order in October 2011. In March 2012, one more episode was ordered, bringing its total to 23 episodes. The series premiere garnered 13.33 million viewers with a 3.1/8 ratings share in the 18–49 demographics, winning its time slot. The season ended with an average of 14.34 million viewers, ranking as the 13th most watched series of the season. The season initially received generally positive reviews from critics, who praised its potential while some criticized its characterization and lack of character development. Reception grew more positive as the season went on, with critics highlighting the exploration of mass surveillance and repercussions of its actions, with the season finale particularly receiving acclaim. In March 2012, CBS renewed the series for a second season.

Season summary
John Reese (Jim Caviezel), a former Special Forces soldier and CIA operative, is burnt out and presumed dead, living as a vagrant in New York City. He is approached by Harold Finch (Michael Emerson), a reclusive billionaire software genius who built a computer system for the U.S. government after September 11, 2001 which monitors all electronic communications and surveillance video feeds, in order to predict future terrorist activities. The computerknown informally as "the Machine", and funded under the codename "Northern Lights"also predicts other lethal crimes as well, but being irrelevant to national security these were deleted daily. 

To prevent abuse of its capabilities, Finch had programmed the Machine to only provide an identity of a person predicted to be involved in an imminent lethal crime, in the form of a Social Security number, but no details of the crime or whether the person of interest is a perpetrator or victim. Those involved in creating Northern Lights, such as Finch's best friend and business partner Nathan Ingram, have largely been killed by the authorities to hide the project's existence. Finch realises that knowledge of the victims deemed "irrelevant" would have saved his partner, and decides to act covertly on the non-terrorism predictions. He hires Reese to conduct surveillance and intervene in these cases. Finch and Reese attempt to understand the threat to, or by, people whose numbers the Machine provides, and try to stop the crime from occurring. They are helped by NYPD Detectives Lionel Fusco (Kevin Chapman), a formerly-corrupt officer whom Reese coerces into helping them, and Joss Carter (Taraji P. Henson), who initially investigates Reese for his vigilante activities.

Cast and characters

Main
 Jim Caviezel as John Reese
 Taraji P. Henson as Joss Carter
 Kevin Chapman as Lionel Fusco
 Michael Emerson as Harold Finch

Recurring 
 Enrico Colantoni as Charlie Burton/Carl Elias
 Elizabeth Marvel as Alicia Corwin
 Susan Misner as Jessica Arndt
 Brennan Brown as Nicholas Donnelly
 Robert John Burke as Patrick Simmons
 Michael Kelly as Mark Snow
 Anthony Mangano as Kane
 Al Sapienza as Raymond Terney
 David Valcin as Anthony S. Marconi/Scarface
 Brett Cullen as Nathan Ingram
 Mark Margolis as Don Gianni Moretti
 Michael Mulheren as Captain Artie Lynch
 John Fiore as Captain Womack
 Darien Sills-Evans as Tyrell Evans
 Annie Parisse as Kara Stanton
 Paige Turco as Zoe Morgan
 Sean McCarthy as Lee Fusco
 Kwoade Cross as Taylor Carter
 Michael McGlone as Bill Szymanski
 Michael Stahl-David as Will Ingram

Notable guests
 Natalie Zea as Diane Hansen
 Chris Chalk as Lawrence Pope
 James Hanlon as James Stills
 Brian d'Arcy James as James Wheeler
 James Carpinello as Joey Durban
 Linda Cardellini as Dr. Megan Tillman
 David Costabile as Judge Samuel Gates
 Michael Cerveris as Jarek Koska
 Enver Gjokaj as Lazlo Yogorov
 Alan Dale as Ulrich Kohl
 David Zayas as Ernest Trask
 Cotter Smith as Denton Weeks
 Astro as Darren McGrady
 Malik Yoba as Andre Wilcox
 José Zúñiga as Vargas
 Reg E. Cathey as Ian Davidson
 Matt Lauria as Adam Saunders
 Sarah Wynter as Jordan Hester
 Rhys Coiro as Jordan Hester
 Seth Gilliam as Des Franklin
 Vincent Curatola as Don Zambrano
 Pablo Schreiber as Tommy Clay
 Jacob Pitts as Henry Peck
 Carrie Preston as Grace Hendricks
 Jay O. Sanders as Special Counsel
 Amy Acker as Dr. Caroline Turing

Episodes

Development

Production
The project started in September 2010 when NBC ordered a put pilot for a series called Odd Jobs after winning a bidding war with ABC. The project had Josh Appelbaum and André Nemec as writers, J. J. Abrams and Bryan Burk as executive producer through their production company Bad Robot Productions and would star Michael Emerson and Terry O'Quinn, both previously worked with Abrams and Burk on Lost. Around this time, Jonathan Nolan was also working on an undisclosed series for CBS with Bad Robot Productions serving as executive producer. In January 2011, NBC announced that Odd Jobs would roll on the next season after delays in the production of the series.

In February 2011, CBS picked up Nolan's series, now titled Person of Interest, ordering a pilot order. A few days later, David Semel was announced to direct the pilot for the series. In April 2011, Greg Plageman joined the series as executive producer and would also serve as showrunner. By May 2011, Deadline Hollywood reported that the pilot was "gaining momentum" compared to other drama series on CBS. A week later, the site reported that it was in a "frontrunner status" to be picked up. In May 13, 2011, CBS officially picked up the pilot to series, ordering a 13-episode season.

Casting
Michael Emerson was the first actor to join the series in February 2011, starring as a "mysterious billionaire who hires a special ops agent". Emerson dropped out of Odd Jobs and was also offered a role in Once Upon a Time. Emerson took the role to avoid being "typecast" as his previous role on Lost as Ben Linus. In March 2011, Jim Caviezel and Taraji P. Henson joined as series regulars, with Caviezel playing the lead character, John Reese, while Henson was set to play a homicide detective Joss Carter. Caviezel took the role as his character was "searching for a purpose. I think, like it hit me, it's going to hit other people there's something besides all the technology in the story." By April 2011, Kevin Chapman also joined the series.

Release

Broadcast
On May 18, 2011, CBS announced that the series would take over the Thursday at 9:00 p.m. slot on the 2011–12 fall schedule, replacing CSI: Crime Scene Investigation, which had the slot since 2001. The decision to take over CSI: Crime Scene Investigations time slot was questioned by many industry analysts. Kelly Kahl, CBS Vice President, Scheduling, said, "To do that you have to have the big guns, and we do. Now we have stability at 8 and 10 PM and a great upside in the middle." The season ended on May 17, 2012.

Home media release
The first season was released on Blu-ray and DVD in region 1 on September 4, 2012, in region 2 on March 18, 2013, and in region 4 on November 7, 2012. 

In 2014, Warner Bros. Television Studios announced that it sold the off-network SVOD of the series to Netflix. On September 1, 2015, the season became available to stream on Netflix. On September 22, 2020, the series left the service and was added to HBO Max on January 23, 2021.

Reception

Ratings
According to CBS, Person of Interest received the highest test ratings of any drama pilot in 15 years, what one CBS executive called "crazy broad appeal you don't usually see", prompting CBS to move CSI, which was broadcast on Thursday for over 10 years, to Wednesday, opening up a slot for Person of Interest. The pilot episode won its time slot, drawing 13.2 million viewers.

Critical reception
The first season of Person of Interest received generally positive reviews, with the pilot episode drawing a favorable response from critics and later episodes receiving higher praise. On Rotten Tomatoes, the season has an approval rating of 63% and average rating of 6.65 out of 10 based on 38 reviews. The site's critical consensus is, "Person of Interest is a well made and well acted espionage procedural, though its characters aren't terribly well developed and its intriguing premise yields mixed results." On Metacritic, the season scored 66 out of 100 based on 26 reviews. 

Of the pilot, David Wiegand of the San Francisco Chronicle said "Person of Interest separates itself from the gimmick pack, not only because of superbly nuanced characterization and writing but also because of how it engages a post-9/11 sense of paranoia in its viewers." David Hinckley of the New York Daily News gave the pilot four stars out of five, commenting on Caviezel's and Emerson's performances, saying Caviezel "brings the right stuff to this role" and Emerson "is fascinating as Mr. Finch." Mary McNamara of the Los Angeles Times stated that in regard to the pilot, "the notion of preventing crimes rather than solving them is an appealing twist... The surveillance graphics are very cool." The episodes "Many Happy Returns" and the finale "Firewall" were particularly acclaimed. Tim Surette of TV.com called the former one of the series' "best episodes", commending Caviezel's performance and the episode's character exploration, while the latter was called "exactly what a season finale should be", with Surette concluding his review by saying "'Firewall' was a spectacular finish to what has been an incredibly surprising first season of Person of Interest."

Accolades

References

External links 
 

Person of Interest seasons
2011 American television seasons
2012 American television seasons